The 1960 LSU Tigers football team represented Louisiana State University during the 1960 NCAA University Division football season.  Under head coach Paul Dietzel, the Tigers had a record of 5–4–1 with a Southeastern Conference record of 2–3–1. It was Dietzel's sixth season as head coach at LSU.

The game vs. Ole Miss was the Tigers' last visit to Oxford, Mississippi until 1989.

Schedule

References

LSU
LSU Tigers football seasons
LSU Tigers football